Men's 800m races for athletes with cerebral palsy at the 2004 Summer Paralympics were held in the Athens Olympic Stadium from 23 to 24 September. Events were held in two disability classes.

T37

The T37 event consisted of 2 heats and a final. It was won by Oleksandr Driha, representing .

1st Round

Heat 1
23 Sept. 2004, 20:50

Heat 2
23 Sept. 2004, 20:57

Final Round
24 Sept. 2004, 19:40

T38

The T38 event consisted of a single race. It was won by Malcolm Pringle, representing .

Final Round
20 Sept. 2004, 21:35

References

M